Héctor Bosque Boix (born 16 August 1978 in Alcañiz, Teruel) is a Spanish retired footballer who played as a midfielder.

Career
Héctor Bosque spent three seasons playing for CD Castellón, where he scored six goals in 94 league matches (most of them in the Segunda División). In July 2007, he signed for Alicante CF on a free transfer from Castellón.

References

External links

1978 births
Living people
People from Alcañiz
Sportspeople from the Province of Teruel
Spanish footballers
Footballers from Aragon
Association football midfielders
Segunda División players
Segunda División B players
Tercera División players
Atlético Madrid C players
Real Oviedo Vetusta players
CD Binéfar players
UB Conquense footballers
CD Castellón footballers
Alicante CF footballers
CD Teruel footballers